"Saying Sorry" is a song by American rock band Hawthorne Heights. It was released on May 22, 2006 as the debut single from their second studio album, If Only You Were Lonely. "Saying Sorry" was released to radio on January 31, 2006. The song peaked at #7 on the Billboard Alternative Songs Chart.

Track listing
Compact Disc (US)
"Saying Sorry"
"Saying Sorry (Acoustic)"
"Ohio Is for Lovers (Acoustic)"

7" blue vinyl (UK)
"Saying Sorry"
"Saying Sorry (Acoustic)"

7" pink vinyl (UK)
"Saying Sorry"
"Ohio Is for Lovers (Acoustic)"

Personnel
JT Woodruff - lead vocals
Casey Calvert - guitars, unclean vocals
Matt Ridenour - bass guitar, backing vocals
Micah Carli - guitar
Eron Bucciarelli - drums

References

External links
 Music video for "Saying Sorry"

2006 singles
2004 songs
Hawthorne Heights songs
Song recordings produced by David Bendeth